John B. Little (October 5, 1929 – May 24, 2020) was an American radiobiologist who was the James Stevens Simmons Professor of Radiobiology Emeritus at Harvard T.H. Chan School of Public Health from 2006 until his death in 2020. He graduated from Harvard College (physics,1951) and Boston University Medical School (MD, 1955).

Career
At the Harvard T.H. Chan School of Public Health, Little was the director of the John B. Little Center for Radiation Sciences and Environmental Health and of the Kresge Center for Environmental Health.

Legacy
Little is credited with “discoveries in radiation biology and cancer biology, including mechanistic aspects of DNA repair, mutagenesis, genomic instability, and other nontargeted effects of exposure that each influence radiation response.”

References

External links
 John B. Little Papers, 1855-2006 (inclusive). H MS c302. Harvard Medical Library, Francis A. Countway Library of Medicine, Boston, Mass.

1929 births
2020 deaths
Harvard School of Public Health faculty
Radiobiologists
21st-century American biologists
Harvard College alumni
Boston University School of Medicine alumni